Rolf Bernhard (born 13 December 1949) is a retired long jumper from Switzerland. A three-time Olympian, he won two medals at the European Indoor Championships. Bernhard competed at the 1972 Summer Olympics, 1976 Summer Olympics, and 1980 Summer Olympics.

Achievements

References

External links
 

1949 births
Living people
Swiss male long jumpers
Athletes (track and field) at the 1972 Summer Olympics
Athletes (track and field) at the 1976 Summer Olympics
Athletes (track and field) at the 1980 Summer Olympics
Olympic athletes of Switzerland
People from Frauenfeld
Sportspeople from Thurgau